Jamie Kavanagh (born 28 May 1990) is an Irish professional boxer from Dublin. He is currently signed with Golden Boy Promotions.

Early life
Kavanagh grew up in Dublin. He began training at the age of eight, when he joined Crumlin Boxing Club, where he trained with future UFC fighter Conor McGregor. He remained there until he was eleven years old, when Kavanagh and his family moved to Málaga, Spain. It was here where he would meet his longtime trainer, Sedano Ruiz. As a result of his upbringing, Kavanagh is also fluent in Spanish.

Amateur career
Kavanagh had a very successful amateur career, in which he amassed a record of 168 wins and 12 defeats. He won seven Irish national titles in that time, along with eight regional titles.

At international level, Kavanagh won his first gold medal aged 13, when he competed with Ireland at the 2003 'Four Nations' Championships. They faced fighters from England, Scotland and Wales. Later that year, he won silver with Ireland in the 'Round Robin' Championships, another team competition where they fought boxers from England, France, Germany, Italy, Ukraine and Lithuania. In 2005, Kavanagh returned to the 'Four Nations' Championships where he took home a silver medal for Ireland. In the following two years, Kavanagh again competed as part of Ireland's 'Round Robin' Championships team. He took home gold in both 2006 and 2007. Kavanagh's final amateur medal came at the 2008 World Youth Championships in Guadalajara, Mexico. Fighting in the Light Welterweight category, he won silver after losing to Cuban fighter, Frank Isla in the final.

Professional career
Kavanagh turned professional in 2009. He subsequently moved to Los Angeles where he would train under Freddie Roach at the Wild Card Gym, and frequently spar with fighters such as Manny Pacquiao.

Kavanagh won on his professional debut on a card with title contenders Victor Ortiz and Amir Khan on 15 May 2010. Kavanagh was named Irish Boxing's Prospect of the Year at the National Boxing Awards in February 2011, beating off competition from Belfast flyweight Jamie Conlan in the process. On 14 July 2012, he beat Paul Valarde in a unanimous decision. On 3 November 2012, he defeated Ramon Valadez (11–3, 6 KOs) in an 8-round slugfest at the Phoenix Club in Anaheim, California, with some boxing pundits stating that round 3 was a "Round of the year" contender.

In June 2013, it was confirmed that Kavanagh had left Freddie Roach and the Wild Card Gym. "Freddie can’t give me all his time. I need, at this point of my career, to be with someone who can", Kavanagh said. "Freddie hadn’t been with me for the last six fights. I needed to shake things up." After voicing his concerns to Golden Boy, they put him in touch with Joel Díaz, who Kavanagh began training with instead.

In February 2016, Kavanagh was scheduled to fight Portuguese boxer Antonio Joao Benito at the National Stadium in Ireland. During the weigh-in for the match, five gunmen stormed the room, killed Dublin gangster David Byrne and injured two others. The Continuity IRA claimed responsibility for the attack. Later that day, the Boxing Union of Ireland announced that the fight would be cancelled.

Personal life
Kavanagh's father, gangster Gerard "Hatchet" Kavanagh, died in September 2014 after being shot while at an Irish bar in Spain. This led to a nine-month hiatus in Kavanagh's career. Just days after his return to the ring in March 2015, Kavanagh's uncle, Paul, was also shot dead in Dublin. Paul, who was just two years older than Jamie, had been one of Kavanagh's first training partners after introducing him to Crumlin Boxing Club when they were young.

Professional boxing record

|- style="margin:0.5em auto; font-size:95%;"
|align="center" colspan=8|20 Wins (10 Knockouts), 1 Loss, 1 Draw
|- style="margin:0.5em auto; font-size:90%;"
|align=center style="border-style: none none solid solid; background: #e3e3e3"|Result
|align=center style="border-style: none none solid solid; background: #e3e3e3"|Record
|align=center style="border-style: none none solid solid; background: #e3e3e3"|Opponent
|align=center style="border-style: none none solid solid; background: #e3e3e3"|Type
|align=center style="border-style: none none solid solid; background: #e3e3e3"|Round (Time)
|align=center style="border-style: none none solid solid; background: #e3e3e3"|Date
|align=center style="border-style: none none solid solid; background: #e3e3e3"|Location
|align=center style="border-style: none none solid solid; background: #e3e3e3"|Notes
|-align=center
|Win || 20-1-1 ||align=left| Oszkar Fiko
|||  ||  || align=left| National Stadium, Dublin
|align=left|
|-align=center
|Win || 19-1-1 ||align=left| Reynaldo Mora
|||  ||  || align=left| Wembley Arena, Wembley, London
|align=left|
|-align=center
|Win || 18-1-1 ||align=left| Miguel Zamudio
|||  ||  || align=left| Fantasy Springs Casino, Indio, California
|align=left|
|-align=center
|Win || 17-1-1 ||align=left| Michael Clark 
|||  ||  || align=left| House of Blues, Boston, Massachusetts
|align=left|
|-align=center
|Win || 16-1-1 ||align=left| Andres Navarro
| || ||  || align=left| House of Blues, Boston, Massachusetts
|align=left|
|-align=center
|Loss|| 15-1-1 ||align=left| Daniel Ruiz
||| ||  || align=left| Arena Quequi, Cancun, Mexico
|align=left|
|-align=center
|Win || 15-0-1 ||align=left| Antonio Meza 
|||  ||  || align=left| Fantasy Springs Casino, Indio, California
|align=left|
|-align=center
|Win || 14-0-1 ||align=left| Adolfo Landeros 
|||  ||  || align=left| Home Depot Center, Carson, California
|align=left|
|-align=center
|Win || 13-0-1 ||align=left| Salvador Garcia
|||  ||  || align=left| Fantasy Springs Casino, Indio, California
|align=left|
|-align=center
|Win || 12-0-1 ||align=left| Ramon Valadez
|||  ||  || align=left| Phoenix Club, Anaheim, California
|align=left|
|-align=center
|Win || 11-0-1 ||align=left| Paul Velarde
|||  ||   || align=left| Mandalay Bay, Las Vegas, Nevada
|align=left|
|-align=center
|Win || 10-0-1 ||align=left| Jorge Ibarra
| || ||  || align=left|Oasis Hotel Complex, Cancun, Mexico
|align=left|
|-align=center
|Win || 9-0-1 ||align=left| Cesar Cisneros
| ||  ||  || align=left|Reliant Arena, Houston, Texas
|align=left|
|-align=center
|style="background: #dae2f1"|Draw || 8-0-1 ||align=left| Ramesis Gil
| ||  ||  || align=left|Convention Center, Washington DC
|align=left|
|-align=center
|Win || 8-0-0 ||align=left| Marcos Herrera
| ||  || || align=left|Mandalay Bay, Las Vegas, Nevada 
|align=left|
|-align=center
|Win || 7-0-0 ||align=left| John Willoughby
| ||  ||  || align=left|Club Nokia, Los Angeles, California
|align=left|
|-align=center
|Win || 6-0-0 ||align=left| Sid Razak
|||  ||  || align=left|Manchester Arena, Manchester, United Kingdom
|align=left|
|-align=center
|Win || 5-0-0 ||align=left| Ramon Flores
| ||  || || align=left|Club Nokia, Los Angeles, California
|align=left|
|-align=center
|Win || 4-0-0 ||align=left| Jacob Thornton
| ||  || || align=left|Mandalay Bay, Las Vegas, Nevada
|align=left|
|-align=center
|Win || 3-0-0 ||align=left| Ricardo Malfavon
| || || || align=left|Club Nokia, Los Angeles, California
|align=left|
|-align=center
|Win || 2-0-0 ||align=left| Luis Sanchez
| ||  ||  || align=left|Club Nokia, Los Angeles, California
|align=left|
|-align=center
|Win || 1-0-0 ||align=left| William Ware
| ||  ||  || align=left|Madison Square Garden, New York, New York
|align=left|
|-align=center

References

External links

1990 births
Irish expatriates in the United States
Light-welterweight boxers
Living people
Irish male boxers